Sottile is a surname. Notable people with the surname include:

Daniele Sottile (born 1979), Italian volleyball player
Leah Sottile, American journalist, writer, and podcast host
Mike Sottile (born 1948), American politician
Stefano Sottile (born 1998), Italian high jumper